Ku70  is a protein that, in humans, is encoded by the XRCC6 gene.

Function 
Together, Ku70 and Ku80 make up the Ku heterodimer, which binds to DNA double-strand break ends and is required for the non-homologous end joining (NHEJ) pathway of DNA repair.  It is also required for V(D)J recombination, which utilizes the NHEJ pathway to promote antigen diversity in the mammalian immune system.

In addition to its role in NHEJ, Ku is also required for telomere length maintenance and subtelomeric gene silencing.

Ku was originally identified when patients with systemic lupus erythematosus were found to have high levels of autoantibodies to the protein.

Aging
Mouse embryonic stem cells with homozygous Ku70 mutations, that is Ku70−/− cells, have markedly increased sensitivity to ionizing radiation compared to heterozygous Ku70+/− or wild-type Ku70+/+ embryonic stem cells.  Mutant mice deficient in Ku70 exhibit early aging.  Using several specific criteria of aging, the mutant mice were found to display the same aging signs as control mice, but at a considerably earlier chronological age.  These results suggest that reduced ability to repair DNA double-strand breaks causes early aging, and that the wild-type Ku70 gene plays an important role in longevity assurance.  (Also see DNA damage theory of aging.)

Clinical

A mutation in this gene has been described in a set of 24 families with autism. While this is suggestive that this gene may play a role in the development of autism, further investigation is required.

Nomenclature 
Ku70 has been referred to by several names including:
 Lupus Ku autoantigen protein p70
 ATP-dependent DNA helicase 2 subunit 1
 X-ray repair complementing defective repair in Chinese hamster cells 6
 X-ray repair cross-complementing 6 (XRCC6)

Interactions 
Ku70 has been shown to interact with:

 CBX5, 
 CHEK1, 
 CREBBP, 
 GCN5L2, 
 HOXC4, 
 Ku80, 
 MRE11A, 
 NCOA6, 
 NCF4, 
 PCNA,
 PTTG1, 
 RPA2, 
 TERF2, 
 TERT 
 VAV1,  and
 WRN.

References

Further reading

External links 
 PDBe-KB provides an overview of all the structure information available in the PDB for Human X-ray repair cross-complementing protein 6